Pârâul Mare may refer to the following places in Romania:

Pârâul Mare, a tributary of the Mureș in Arad County
Pârâul Mare, a tributary of the Bâlta in Gorj County
Pârâul Mare, a tributary of the Bega Luncanilor in Timiș County
Pârâul Mare, a tributary of the Lotru in Vâlcea County
Pârâul Mare, a tributary of the Niraj in Mureș County
Pârâul Mare, a tributary of the Râmnicel in Vrancea County
Pârâul Mare, a tributary of the Râul Negru in Covasna County
Pârâul Mare, a tributary of the Siret in Suceava County
Pârâul Mare, a village in the commune Ceahlău, Neamț County
Pârâu Mare, a village in the commune Ibănești, Mureș County